Andrew Reilly (born 26 October 1985 in Luton) is a former professional footballer who played in The Football League for Wycombe Wanderers.

Reilly was selected by the Scotland national under-21 football team in 2004.

References

1985 births
Living people
Scottish footballers
Wycombe Wanderers F.C. players
Barnet F.C. players
English Football League players
Scotland under-21 international footballers
Footballers from Luton
Association football fullbacks